Joann Burke (born 3 November 1969) is a road cyclist from New Zealand. She was born in Otahuhu. She represented her nation at the 1992 Summer Olympics in the women's road race.

References

External links
 profile at sports-reference.com

New Zealand female cyclists
Cyclists at the 1992 Summer Olympics
Olympic cyclists of New Zealand
Living people
Cyclists from Auckland
1969 births
20th-century New Zealand women